Lama is a Bai language spoken along the Lancang River (upper Mekong) in Lanping County and Weixi County, in western Yunnan, China.

Up to the 16th edition of Ethnologue (2009), the code lay was assigned to "Lama (Myanmar)", listed in the index of languages by C. F. Voegelin and F. M. Voegelin (1977) as a Nungish language of Myanmar having 3,000 speakers. In 2013 the reference name for the code was changed to "Bai, Lama", identifying one of two Northern Bai languages, the other being Panyi Bai.

References

Sino-Tibetan languages